Henrietta Kelemen (born 1994) is a Hungarian model and beauty pageant titleholder who was crowned Miss Universe Hungary 2014 and represented Hungary in Miss Universe 2014 pageant.

Pageantry

Miss Hungary 2012
Kelemen was crowned as Miss Hungary 2012.

Miss Universe Hungary 2014
Kelemen was crowned as Miss Universe Hungary 2014 on September 16, 2014, and represented Budapest.

Miss Universe 2014
Kelemen competed at the Miss Universe 2014 pageant but did not place.

References 

Living people
Hungarian beauty pageant winners
1994 births
Miss Universe 2014 contestants